Besov is a rural locality (a khutor) in Chernorechenskoye Rural Settlement, Kikvidzensky District, Volgograd Oblast, Russia. The population was 32 as of 2010.

Geography 
Besov is located on Khopyorsko-Buzulukskaya plain, on the bank of the Chyornaya River, 37 km southeast of Preobrazhenskaya (the district's administrative centre) by road. Chernolagutinsky is the nearest rural locality.

References 

Rural localities in Kikvidzensky District